Sir Iain Colquhoun, 7th Baronet, 29th Laird of Luss, KT, DSO & Bar, FRSE (20 June 1887 – 12 November 1948), was a Scottish landowner and British Army soldier during the First World War.

Military career
During the First World War, Colquhoun served in the Scots Guards. In 1914, the opposing troops on the Western Front had unofficially observed a Christmas truce. The following year, however, when the 28-year-old Captain Colquhoun agreed to a German officer's request for a short truce on Christmas Day, lasting about an hour, he was brought before a court-martial. He was defended by Raymond Asquith, son of Prime Minister H. H. Asquith (the Prime Minister was Colquhoun's wife's uncle). On 17 January 1916, he was found guilty after a five-hour trial, but received the lightest possible sentence, a reprimand. The sentence was remitted shortly afterwards by General Sir Douglas Haig, as Commander-in-Chief of the British Expeditionary Force, in view of Colquhoun's former distinguished conduct in the field.

By 1918 he was Commanding Officer of 2/4th Battalion, Leicestershire Regiment in 59th (2nd North Midland) Division. When the German spring offensive opened on 21 March 1918, the division's forward defences were quickly overrun. 2/4th Leicesters had only just come out of the line after 24 hours of continuous trench duty, but were sent straight back up to assist in the defence. The battalion could get no further forward than the rear of the Battle Zone where the 'line' was no more than a yet-to-be-dug trench marked out with the turf removed and no barbed wire. The men extended along the line even though they were completely exposed in the open. Under the inspiring leadership of Lieutenant-Colonel Colquhoun and Regimental Sergeant-Major 'African Joe' Withers, the battalion held off the Germans for the rest of the day, with modest casualties.

Colquhoun was wounded during the war and awarded the Distinguished Service Order (1916) and Bar (1918) and a Mention in Dispatches. After the war he was Honorary Colonel of the 9th Battalion Argyll and Sutherland Highlanders and Glasgow University Officer Training Corps, and President of the Dunbartonshire Territorial Association.

Post-war
He was Lord Lieutenant of Dunbartonshire from 1919 until his death, Lord High Commissioner to the General Assembly of the Church of Scotland in 1932, 1940 and 1941 and Lord Rector of Glasgow University from 1934 to 1937. He was created a Knight of the Thistle in 1937. He was elected a Fellow of the Royal Society of Edinburgh in 1938 and resigned in 1942.

Family
Colquhoun was the son and heir of Alan John Colquhuon, 6th baronet, and his first wife, Justine Henrietta Kennedy. He succeeded his father as the 7th baronet in 1910, as Sir Iain Colquhoun of Luss and Chief of the Clan Colquhoun. Sir Iain married Geraldine Bryde (Dinah) Tennant (a granddaughter of Sir Charles Tennant, 1st Baronet) on 10 February 1915, and they had two sons (the elder succeeded his father as 9th baronet) and three daughters. One of their daughters, Fiona, a Segrave Trophy winner, married the 8th Earl of Arran (1910–1983), an Irish peer; the present 9th Earl is their son.

Notes

References
 Burke's Peerage, Baronetage and Knightage, various editions.
 Brig-Gen Sir James E. Edmonds, History of the Great War: Military Operations, France and Belgium 1918, Vol I, The German March Offensive and its Preliminaries, London: Macmillan, 1935/Imperial War Museum and Battery Press, 1995, .
 Martin Middlebrook, The Kaiser's Battle, 21 March 1918: The First Day of the German Spring Offensive, London: Allen Lane, 1978/Penguin, 1983, .

External links
 

1887 births
1948 deaths
Scots Guards officers
Royal Leicestershire Regiment officers
British Army personnel of World War I
British Army personnel who were court-martialled
Knights of the Thistle
Lord-Lieutenants of Dunbartonshire
Baronets in the Baronetage of Great Britain
Rectors of the University of Glasgow
Lords High Commissioner to the General Assembly of the Church of Scotland
Companions of the Distinguished Service Order
Fellows of the Royal Society of Edinburgh
Participants of the Christmas truce of 1915